Charles Vincent may refer to:

 Charles Vincent (playwright) (1828–1888), French playwright, novelist, journalist and publisher
 Charles Vincent (historian), American historian
 Charles Vincent (theatre) (1823–1868), English actor/manager in Australia
 Chuck Vincent (born 1970s), American basketball player
 Chuck Vincent (director) (1940–1991), American film producer, screenwriter, editor and director